The 1990–91 BHL season was the ninth season of the British Hockey League, the top level of ice hockey in Great Britain. 10 teams participated in the league, and the Durham Wasps won the league title by finishing first in the regular season. They also won the playoff championship

Regular season

Playoffs

Group A

Group B

Semifinals
Cardiff Devils 4-7 Peterborough Pirates
Durham Wasps 11-6 Murrayfield Racers

Final
Durham Wasps 7-4 Peterborough Pirates

References

External links
Season on hockeyarchives.info

1
United
British Hockey League seasons